George Norton Galloway (1841 or 1842 – February 9, 1904) was a United States soldier who fought in the American Civil War as a member of the Union Army. On military records of the period, his surname was spelled as "Gallaway" or "Galloway".

Formative years
Born in Philadelphia, Pennsylvania, Galloway was employed as a brush maker during the early 1860s. Pennsylvania military records created in 1861 documented that he was 5' 9-1/2" tall with brown hair, dark eyes, and a light complexion during his late teen years.

Military career
Galloway enrolled for Civil War military service in Philadelphia on September 19, 1861. Mustering in there that same day as a private, he became part of Company G in the 95th Pennsylvania Infantry Regiment (also known as the 95th Pennsylvania Volunteers).

Military records indicate that Galloway deserted his regiment on July 1, 1863, the day before the 95th Pennsylvania fought in Gettysburg. Arrested on September 2, 1863, he was later sent back to his unit, where he remained until he was transferred October 14, 1864. It was during this period of service that he demonstrated such bravery that he was awarded his nation's highest award for valor, the U.S. Medal of Honor. He was then honorably discharged from military service on November 18, 1864.

He died on February 9, 1904, and is interred at Mount Moriah Cemetery in Philadelphia, Pennsylvania.

Medal of Honor citation
Galloway was presented with his U.S. Medal of Honor on October 24, 1895. Awarded for his actions at Alsop's Farm in Virginia in May 1864, his citation read as follows:

See also
List of American Civil War Medal of Honor recipients: G–L

References

1840s births
1904 deaths
American Civil War recipients of the Medal of Honor
Burials at Mount Moriah Cemetery (Philadelphia)
Military personnel from Philadelphia
People of Pennsylvania in the American Civil War
Union Army soldiers
United States Army Medal of Honor recipients